Agapanthia incerta is a species of beetle in the family Cerambycidae. It was described by Plavilstshikov in 1930.

References

incerta
Beetles described in 1930